The 1957 VPI Gobblers football team represented the Virginia Polytechnic Institute in the 1957 NCAA University Division football season.

Schedule

Players
The following players were members of the 1957 football team according to the roster published in the 1958 edition of The Bugle, the Virginia Tech yearbook.

Coaching Staff
The following coaches were members of the 1957 football team according to the roster published in the 1958 edition of The Bugle.

References

VPI
Virginia Tech Hokies football seasons
VPI Gobblers football